Erik Juárez Blanquet (October 29, 1980 – March 10, 2020) was a Mexican teacher, politician, and member of the Party of the Democratic Revolution (PRD). He served as the Municipal President of Angamacutiro, Michoacán, from 2008 to 2011. Juárez was then elected to the national Chamber of Deputies of Mexico, where he represented the 2nd federal district of Michoacán from September 1, 2015, until April 12, 2018. He briefly returned to the Chamber of Deputies from July 6, 2018, to August 31, 2018.

On March 10, 2020, Erik Juárez Blanquet was shot and killed by assailants while he was a passenger in truck driving on Avenida Morelos Norte in Morelia, Michoacán. He was 39-years old. The two attackers approached Juárez's truck on motorcycles and shot him at least five times, before escaping and abandoning the motorcycle. They were later captured.

References

1980 births
2020 deaths
Members of the Chamber of Deputies (Mexico)
Members of the Congress of Michoacán
Municipal presidents in Michoacán
Party of the Democratic Revolution politicians
Politicians from Michoacán
Assassinated Mexican politicians
21st-century Mexican politicians
Deaths by firearm in Mexico